Gonna Make You Sweat is the debut studio album by American musical production group C+C Music Factory, released in the US on December 18, 1990. Following on the success of contemporaries Black Box and Technotronic, Gonna Make You Sweat was a worldwide smash, reaching number two on the US Billboard 200.

The album's first single "Gonna Make You Sweat (Everybody Dance Now)" reached number one on the US Billboard Hot 100 for two weeks in February 1991. The song also reached number one on Billboard'''s Top R&B Singles, Dance Club, and Dance Singles charts, as well as number three on the Australian ARIA Singles chart and UK Singles Chart.

Subsequent singles "Here We Go (Let's Rock & Roll)" and "Things That Make You Go Hmmm..." both became top-five entries on the Billboard Hot 100.

Reception

The album received generally mixed reviews from critics. James Muretich from Calgary Herald wrote, "From the title track to "Things That Make You Go Hmmm..." (a nod here to TV talk show host Arsenio Hall), the music is irresistably infectious to anyone the least susceptible to dancin' the night away. C+C Music Factory cleverly snatch melodic lines from people like Suzanne Vega while also providing a few riffs of their own, especially those of guitarist Paul Pesco. The lyrics also avoid crotch-rap cliches. C+C Music Factory is destined to become this year's dance hit factory." Marisa Fox from Entertainment Weekly felt that "this high-energy album has all the makings of a dance-club hit." She added that it's "a lot of fun — and it does live up to its name." In a contemporary review, Select'' stated that "For every might tune like the title track, there's an over-long muddled "What's This Word Called Love?" and "the producers knack of building indestructible house beats is matched only by their inconsistency". The review concluded that the songs were over-long and have trouble sustaining interest."

Track listing

Personnel
Deborah Cooper, Zelma Davis, Martha Wash, Freedom Williams, David Cole, Karen Bernod, Craig Derry, Yolanda Lee, Duran Ramos, Norma Jean Wright – lead and backing vocals
Robert Clivillés – keyboards, synthesizers, keyboard & synth programming, percussion, drum programming, backing vocals
David Cole – keyboards, backing vocals
Ricky Crespo – keyboards
Alan Friedman – keyboards, synthesizers, drums, percussion
Hugh McCracken – harmonica
Paul Pesco – guitars

Production
Arranged and produced by David Cole, Robert Clivillés, Freedom Williams and Larry Yasgar
Recorded and engineered by Rodney Ascue, Alec Head, Acar S. Key and Tony Maserati
Assistant engineers: Paul Berry, Bruce Calder, John Parthum, Steve Wellner
Mixed by Acar S. Key and Bob Rosa

Charts

Weekly charts

Year-end charts

Certifications

References

1990 debut albums
C+C Music Factory albums
Columbia Records albums
Albums produced by David Cole (record producer)
Pop albums by American artists